The Episcopal Church in the Philippines (ECP; ; Ilocano: Simabaan nga Episkopal iti Filipinas) is a province of the Anglican Communion comprising the country of the Philippines. It was established by the Episcopal Church of the United States (Protestant Episcopal Church in the United States of America) in 1901 by American missionaries led by Charles Henry Brent, who served as the first resident bishop, when the Philippines was opened to Protestant American missionaries. It became an autonomous province of the Anglican Communion on May 1, 1990.

At present, the Episcopal Church has seven dioceses. Under Rev. Charles Henry Brent of the Episcopal Church of the United States of America, it was responsible for founding and overseeing institutions such as St. Luke's Medical Center, Brent International School, St. Stephen's High School, and Trinity University of Asia. Its principal ministerial training institution is St. Andrew's Theological Seminary. The current Prime Bishop is Brent Harry Alawas. Its national headquarters is the Cathedral Heights, New Manila, Quezon City.

The Church is in a concordat of full communion with the Philippine Independent Church and is a member of both the Christian Conference of Asia and the National Council of Churches in the Philippines.

History

Military chaplaincy and church for expatriates

When the Philippines was ceded to the United States from Spain in 1898, the Philippine islands was opened to Protestant American missions. A comity agreement was created between Protestant sects to divide the islands. The Protestant Episcopalians and Seventh-day Adventists did not join the agreement because they wanted to go elsewhere in the Philippines.

The Episcopal Church in the Philippines virtually began with the first Episcopal worship service conducted in the Philippines by the Rev. Charles Pierce, an Episcopal Church chaplain of the U.S. Armed Forces that occupied Manila in 1898. This service was conducted on September 4, 1898 for the Americans and other English-speaking residents in Manila. The first Episcopal Church worship service conducted for Filipinos took place on December 25, 1898, Christmas Day.

In April 1899, Hugh Nethercott and James Smiley of the Brotherhood of St. Andrew arrived to assist the American chaplains in their work. In September 1899, Frederick R. Graves, who was then serving as the Bishop of Shanghai in China, visited Manila. Appointed to oversee American church work in the Philippines and later, bishop-in-charge, he held worship services in the home of a British couple. He confirmed five English-speaking persons and advised his congregation to build a church. He also received the first seven Filipinos into the Episcopal Church.

The first baptisms in Manila were performed in 1900 by U.S. Army Chaplain John Marvine when he baptized three Amoy-speaking nationals and 12 more by the end of the year. These baptisms formally started Episcopal mission work among the Chinese in Manila.

As a missionary district of PECUSA

From being a mere outreach chaplaincy of the Episcopal Church chaplains of the U.S. occupation armed forces in the Philippines. Temporarily placed under the oversight of Bishop Frederick Graves, it was officially created as the Missionary District of the Philippine Islands of the Protestant Episcopal Church of the United States (PECUSA) by the PECUSA General Convention held in San Francisco on October 4–11, 1901. The same convention elected the Rev. Charles Henry Brent as bishop. In December 1901, Brent was consecrated and became the first bishop of the Missionary District under the jurisdiction of PECUSA. His successor, Gouverneur Frank Mosher, served from 1920 to 1941.

From October 11, 1901, when the church was officially established in the Philippines, it took the church almost 36 years to produce its first Filipino clergymen with the ordination of Eduardo Longid, Albert Masferre, and Mark Suluen to the Sacred Order of Deacons on January 25, 1937. It took another 22 years to produce the first Filipino Episcopal bishop with the consecration of Benito C. Cabanban as Suffragan Bishop on February 24, 1959.

Philippine Episcopal Church

In October 1937, the Missionary District of the Philippine Islands was renamed the Philippine Episcopal Church (PEC) through the action of the House of Bishops of PECUSA's Cincinnati General Convention. This signified a change in status of the Philippine Church from that of a missionary district to a ‘diocese’ under PECUSA. Thirty-four years later (in October 1971), PECUSA granted the PEC request to divide the lone diocese into three dioceses – the Dioceses of Central, Northern, and Southern Philippines. Each had a Filipino diocesan bishop – Bishop Cabanban, Bishop Eduardo Longid, and Bishop Constancio Manguramas, respectively.

With three dioceses, the PEC was organized and operated like a church province in the Anglican Communion. However, unlike the other church provinces, the PEC did not have a Metropolitan Authority because it was still under the jurisdiction of PECUSA. The three dioceses were considered dioceses of both the PEC and the Episcopal Church in the U.S.A. (ECUSA).

As a diocese, the PEC had its own constitution and canons, national council, national biennial convention, House of Bishops, and National Office, among others.

Full autonomy
On May 1, 1990, the PEC was officially separated from ECUSA and inaugurated as an autonomous church taking its place as a church province in the Anglican Communion with the name Episcopal Church in the Philippines (ECP).

When the church had been admitted as a missionary district, its first missionary bishop, Charles Henry Brent, unlike other Protestant missionaries, had no intention of converting Filipino Roman Catholics to Anglicanism. As a consequence, his missionary focus was in those parts of the islands that had not previously been evangelised, in particular, in the mountain provinces and in Mindanao. In Manila missionary work was also done among the non-Christian Chinese community. In Manila Bishop Brent felt his ministry to the American community should be his main focus. He wrote: “From every point of view, the most important part of our work is among Americans and other English-speaking people.” One of the first things he did was to build a cathedral in downtown Manila, the Cathedral of St. Mary & St. John, which was destroyed during World War II and later rebuilt in Quezon City. It was at that time that part of the Cathedral congregation formed the Church of the Holy Trinity, now located in the upscale village of Forbes Park, Makati. Holy Trinity's priest or rector from its beginning had always been an expatriate and its congregation was for the most part of expatriates; in recent years this has changed considerably and at the present it is an even mixture of Chinese Filipino, American/European and Filipino.

For the physical health needs of his constituency, Brent also established St. Luke's Hospital (initially named University Hospital, now known as St. Luke's Medical Center). He also endorsed and supported the establishment of St. Luke's Nursing Training School (now St. Luke's-Trinity College of Nursing) to answer the need for well-trained nurses to serve the hospital.

For the educational needs and in response to requests from the American parents for a boarding school for their children, Bishop Brent founded a school in Baguio for American boys. First called the Baguio School and later Brent School, this school is now known as Brent International School-Baguio. It is one of four Brent International Schools under the umbrella of a mother corporation called Brent International Schools Inc. The others are Brent International School-Manila/Biñan, BIS-Subic, and BIS-Boracay. In addition to children of expatriates, a large number, if not the majority, of enrollees in the Brent Schools are Filipinos from well-to-do families.

With regard to starting missionary work and establishing a church for and among the unchurched, Bishop Brent was against proselytization. Having observed the extensive work of the Roman Catholic Church in the islands, he decided not to “put up an altar over and against another altar”. He adopted a policy of “non-interference under ordinary circumstances with the adherents of other churches”. Along this line, he decided to concentrate the mission work of the newly established church on the Americans and white Europeans in the country as well as on those geographic areas where there were non-Christians or where the unchurched were not being served by any church.

At that time, most non-Christians in the Philippines were migrant Chinese in Manila, indigenous peoples in the North and in the South as well the Muslims in Mindanao. The "pagan natives" of the north and of the south and the Muslims, living in communities in mountain jungles, had fought against the subjugation and rule of the colonial Spanish regime and had not effectively fallen under the rule and governance of Spain. It was to these people and communities that this church went to seek its members through conversions and baptisms.

The church succeeded in its mission and evangelism work among the indigenous people but failed among the Muslims. It converted only five young Muslims girls by uprooting these girls from their communities in Mindanao and bringing them to the Cordillera in the north, where they lived and grew with the missionaries in Christian communities. They were educated, got married, and settled in the Cordillera and did not go back to their Muslim roots in the South.

Bishop Brent's policy of not putting an altar against another altar and the initial and subsequent concentration of missionary work on areas inhabited by non-Christians explains why most of the members of the ECP are predominantly from tribal communities. This also explains why the ECP's work is concentrated in the northern and southern regions of the country. In like manner, it explains why it took almost four decades for this Church to produce its first Filipino clergymen and more than half-a-century to produce its first Filipino bishop, all of whom were from tribal communities. It was this Church that introduced literacy among these people and communities. It was this Church that first established schools, hospitals, clinics and roads in these oft-neglected communities. In time, the government was able to establish public schools, hospitals, and rural health centers for these communities. As a result, this Church phased out some of its schools and clinics in favor of the government providing such basic services needed by these communities.

Doctrine and practice
The Episcopal Church in the Philippines maintains the historic threefold ministry of bishops, priests, and deacons. A local variant of the Book of Common Prayer is used.

Structure

Prime Bishop
The Episcopal Church in the Philippines is headed by the Prime Bishop of the Philippines, serving as both primate and metropolitan archbishop of the entire church. The post was created in 1969 as a metropolitan role under the primacy of the Presiding Bishop of the American Episcopal Church, and took on the additional role of Primate when the province gained autonomy in 1990.

Contrary to common Anglican practice, but like the Presiding Bishop of the American Episcopal Church and previously the Supreme Bishop of the Philippine Independent Church, the Prime Bishop is not a diocesan bishop.

Prime Bishop
1969 – 1978 : Benito Cabanban
1978 – 1982 : Constancio Manguramas
1982 – 1985 : Richard Abellon
1986 – 1990 : Manuel Lumpias

Prime Bishop and Primate
1990 – 1992 : Richard Abellon
1993 – 1997 : Narciso Ticobay
1997 – 2009 : Ignacio Soliba (Ignacio Capuyan Soliba)
2009 – 2014 : Edward Malecdan
2014 – 2017 : Renato Abibico
2017 – 2021 : Joel Pachao
2021 – present : Brent Harry Alawas

Dioceses
The Episcopal Church in the Philippines consists of seven dioceses, five in Luzon and two in Mindanao:

Diocese of Central Philippines, with See in Quezon City, Metro Manila
Diocese of Southern Philippines, with See in Cotabato City
Diocese of Northern Philippines, with See in Bontoc, Mt. Province
Diocese of Northern Luzon, with See in Tabuk, Kalinga
Diocese of North Central Philippines, with See in Baguio
Diocese of Santiago, with See in Santiago, Isabela
 The diocese was created in 1999 from the Diocese of Northern Philippines with inaugural bishop Alexander A Wandag, who is the current bishop
Diocese of Davao, with See in Davao City
The incumbent bishop of Davao is Jonathan Labasan Casimina

An eighth diocese in the Visayas is also being contemplated, starting with the new congregation in Cebu.

References

External links

 
Anglican Communion church bodies
Christian organizations established in 1901
Christian denominations established in the 20th century
Anglicanism in the Philippines
Members of the World Council of Churches
Christian denominations in Asia
1901 establishments in the Philippines
Anglican denominations established in the 20th century
Philippines